Gellatly is a surname. Notable people with the surname include:

Charlie Gellatly (1910–1973), British footballer 
Jessie Gellatly (1882–1935), British medical doctor
Jim Gellatly (born 1968), Scottish radio presenter and DJ
John Arthur Gellatly (1869–1963), American politician
Stephen Gellatly (born 1980), New Zealand cricketer